This is a list of forms of electricity named after scientists.  The terms in this list are mostly archaic usages but are found in many 19th and early 20th-century publications.

Adjectives 
 faradic  Of electricity that is alternating, especially when obtained from an induction coil.  Named after Michael Faraday who built the first electromagnetic generator.
 galvanic  Of electricity that is not alternating.  Named after Luigi Galvani.<ref>{{multiref|de la Pena, p. 95|Chalovich, 20' 30}}</ref>
 voltaic  Of electricity derived from an electrochemical cell or battery.  Named after Alessandro Volta who built the first battery, the voltaic pile.  In most contexts it can be considered a synonym of galvanic.

 Nouns (applications) 
 Faradization  Electrotherapy treatment of a person with faradic electricity.  Coined by Duchenne de Boulogne and named after Michael Faraday.
 Franklinization  Electrotherapy by charging a person to high voltage with static electricity.  Named after Benjamin Franklin.
 d'Arsonvalization  Electrotherapy treatment of a person with high frequency electricity.  Named after Jacques-Arsène d'Arsonval.

 Nouns (forms) 
 Faradism  Faradic electricity
 Franklinism  High voltage static electricity as used in Franklinization
 Galvanism  Originally, voltaic electricity, but can also be used to distinguish Galvani's animal electricity from Volta's chemical/metal contact electricity

 References 

 Bibliography 
 Borck, Cornelius, Brainwaves: A Cultural History of Electroencephalography, Routledge, 2018 .
 Chalovich, Joseph M, [http://thescholarship.ecu.edu/handle/10342/3929 'Franklinization: Early Therapeutic Use of Static Electricity], ScholarShip, East Carolina University, 23 January 2012.
 Martellucci,  Jacopo (ed), Electrical Stimulation for Pelvic Floor Disorders, Springer, 2014 .
 de la Peňa, Carolyn Thomas, The Body Electric: How Strange Machines Built the Modern American, New York University Press, 2005 .
 Pinchuck, LS; Nikolaev, VI; Tsetkova, EA; Goldade, VA, Tribology and Biophysics of Artificial Joints, Elsevier, 2005 .
 Tate, Thomas, On Magnetism, Voltaic Electricity, and Electrodynamics, London: Longman, Brown, Green, and Longmans, 1854 .
 de Young, Mary, Encyclopedia of Asylum Therapeutics, 1750-1950s, McFarland, 2015 .

Electricity
Electricity
Electricity
Electricity